Miki Sasaki (佐々木 みき, Sasaki Miki, born December 15, 1976) is a former volleyball player from Japan, who competed at the 2004 Summer Olympics in Athens, Greece, wearing the #4 jersey. There she and the Japan women's national team took fifth place. She participated in the 2003 FIVB World Grand Prix.

Sasaki played as a wing-spiker.

References

External links
 FIVB biography
 Management Company

1976 births
Living people
Japanese women's volleyball players
Pioneer Red Wings players
Volleyball players at the 2004 Summer Olympics
Olympic volleyball players of Japan
Place of birth missing (living people)
Asian Games medalists in volleyball
Volleyball players at the 1998 Asian Games
Medalists at the 1998 Asian Games
Asian Games bronze medalists for Japan